The Monash University Faculty of Medicine, Nursing and Health Sciences is an Australian health care provider. It comprises 10 schools, teaching and clinical centers and research institutes. The faculty offers undergraduate, postgraduate and professional education programs in medicine, nursing and allied health, and is a member of the M8 Alliance of Academic Health Centers, Universities and National Academies.

The faculty's current dean is Professor Christina Mitchell.

Campuses

Australia
The faculty primarily operates from Monash University's Clayton, Caulfield and Peninsula campuses, all based in metropolitan Melbourne.  Of these, Monash Clayton is home to the majority of the faculty's schools, research centers and technology platforms.

The Peninsula campus is located close to Frankston Hospital. Courses taught at this campus include nursing and midwifery, emergency health and paramedic practice, physiotherapy and occupational therapy. In 2016, the university committed $20 million to developing the campus.

The graduate-entry Bachelor of Medical Science and Doctor of Medicine (MD) program is the only course still offered at Churchill, following the transfer of the Monash Gippsland campus to Federation University Australia in 2014.

Researchers, clinicians and students are also based at off-campus locations such as The Alfred Hospital, Monash Medical Centre and Box Hill Hospital.

International
Monash Malaysia is home to the Jeffrey Cheah School of Medicine and Health Sciences, which offers undergraduate courses in medicine and psychology. The medical course is the only program outside of Australia to be accredited by the Australian Medical Council. This campus is also home to the Brains Research Institute at Monash Sunway (BRIMS) and the Southeast Community Observatory (SEACO).

At Monash South Africa, the School of Health Sciences teaches undergraduate programs in public health and social science. It is one of the only institutions in Africa to offer a degree in public health.

Schools
The Faculty of Medicine, Nursing and Health Sciences is made up of ten schools.

Central Clinical School
Eastern Health Clinical School
Monash School of Medicine
School of Biomedical Sciences
School of Clinical Sciences at Monash Health
School of Nursing and Midwifery
School of Psychological Sciences
School of Primary and Allied Health Care
School of Public Health and Preventive Medicine
School of Rural Health

Research
The Faculty of Medicine, Nursing and Health Sciences is Monash's largest research faculty, with a research income of over $172 million in 2015. 
Research from the faculty has been published in Nature Publishing Group, The Lancet and The New England Journal of Medicine.

The faculty's research is categorized into nine thematic areas:
 Cancer and blood diseases
 Cardiovascular disease
 Critical care, trauma and perioperative medicine
 Development, stem cells and regenerative medicine
 Infection, inflammation and immunity
 Metabolism, obesity and men's health
 Neurosciences and mental health
 Public health and health systems improvement
 Women's, children's and reproductive health

Research centers and institutes 
The Faculty of Medicine, Nursing and Health Sciences incorporates three research institutes:
Australian Regenerative Medicine Institute (ARMI)
Monash Biomedicine Discovery Institute (BDI)
Monash Institute of Cognitive and Clinical Neurosciences (MICCN)

Research centers within or jointly established by the faculty include:
Andrology Australia
Australia New Zealand Intensive Care Research Centre (ANZIC-RC)
Australian Centre for Blood Diseases
Australian Centre for Human Health Risk Assessment
Australian Cochrane Centre ACC
Brain Research Institute at Monash Sunway (BRIMS)
Centre for Developmental Psychiatry and Psychology
Centre for Inflammatory Diseases (CID)
Centre for Obesity Research and Education (CORE)
Centre of Cardiovascular Research and Education in Therapeutics (CCRET)
Centre for Research Excellence in Patient Safety (CRE-PS)
Hudson Institute of Medical Research
Michael Kirby Centre for Public Health and Human Rights
Monash Ageing Research Centre (MONARC)
Monash Alfred Psychiatry Research Centre (MAPrc)
Monash Cardiovascular Research Centre (MCRC)
Monash Centre for Occupational and Environmental Health (MonCOEH)
Monash Centre for the Study of Ethics in Medicine and Society (CEMS)
Monash Institute of Medical Engineering (MIME)
Problem Gambling Research and Treatment Centre (PGRTC)
The Ritchie Centre
Southern Synergy

The faculty also participates in the Monash Partners Academic Health Science Centre, 1 of 4 advanced health research and translation centres in Australia. Monash Partners comprises:
Alfred Health
Baker IDI Heart and Diabetes Institute
Burnet Institute
Cabrini Health
Epworth HealthCare
Hudson Institute of Medical Research
Monash Health
Monash University

Translational research 
Monash's Faculty of Medicine, Nursing and Health Science has demonstrated a commitment to translational research and offers a PhD and Graduate Certificate in Translational Research.

In 2016, Monash University partnered with the Hudson Institute of Medical Research and Monash Health to open a new translational research facility at the Monash Health Translation Precinct (MHTP), which co-locates scientists, researchers, clinicians and patients in a collaborative environment.

Teaching and learning 
The Faculty of Medicine, Nursing and Health Sciences is one of the largest providers of education for doctors, nurses and allied health professionals in Australia. Courses are offered across all areas of health and most incorporate clinical placement.

Undergraduate
The faculty offers bachelor-level degrees in:
Biomedical science
Health sciences (emergency health and paramedic practice, human services, public health and radiation sciences)
Medicine
Nursing
Nutrition science
Occupational therapy
Physiotherapy
Psychology
Radiography and medical imaging

The faculty also offers a number of one year honors level research degrees.

As of 2017 the Bachelor of Medicine and Bachelor of Surgery (Honors) MBBS program has been replaced with a Bachelor of Medical Science and Doctor of Medicine (MD).

Postgraduate
Graduate courses (by coursework and research) are available across areas including:
Addictive behaviors
Dietetics
Forensic medicine
Medical ultrasound
Public health
Reproductive Sciences
Social work

The faculty also offers higher research degrees with research masters, doctoral courses (PhD) and professional doctorates. In 2017, over 1300 students are completing higher degrees by research within the faculty.

Professional education
The Monash Institute for Health and Clinical Education launched in 2016 to offer short courses and workshops for healthcare professionals.

Education programs 
The university conducts parent education programs such as The Early Journey of Life, focused on the first 1000 days of a child's life (from pregnancy to 2-year-old). The intervention is conducted by the RTCCD Vietnam and Monash University in rural Ha Nam province of Vietnam by addressing maternal physical and mental health and child health and development through combination of learning activities and social support.

Rankings
34 for Clinical Medicine and Pharmacy, Academic Ranking of World Universities (ARWU), 2016 
41 for Clinical, Preclinical and Health Sciences, Times Higher Education World University Rankings, 2016-2017 
14 for Nursing, QS World University Rankings, 2020 
31 for Medicine, QS World University Rankings, 2020

Student life

Clubs and societies
Monash University Medical Undergraduates’ Society (MUMUS) represents all medical students across the Monash Clayton and Churchill campuses.

Wildfire is the university's rural and indigenous health club.

The Monash Medical Orchestra (MMO) is a musical ensemble of medical students and other students from the Faculty of Medicine, Nursing and Health Sciences, founded by MBBS student Tim Martin in 2011.

Alumni
As of 2017, the Faculty of Medicine, Nursing and Health Sciences has an alumni network of over 41,000 alumni across 90 countries. Counting Rhodes and Fulbright scholars and Australian of the Year recipients among their graduates, notable Faculty alumni include:
David de Kretser – medical researcher and former Governor of Victoria
Julian Savulescu - Director of the Oxford Uehiro Centre for Practical Ethics
Thomas Oxley - CEO of Synchron, Inventor of Stent rode
Richard Di Natale – Australian Senator and leader of the Australian Greens
Patrick McGorry – psychiatrist and Australian of the Year 2010 
John Murtagh AM – author of leading medical textbook John Murtagh’s General Practice 
Sam Prince – doctor, entrepreneur and philanthropist; founder of Zambrero
Ranjana Srivastava – oncologist and author

References

External links 
 Monash University, Faculty of Medicine, Nursing and Health Sciences website
 Virtual tour of the Faculty of Medicine, Nursing and Health Sciences
 M8 Alliance of Academic Health Centers and Medical Universities

Medicine